Serena Iliffe (born 6 January 1960) is a British alpine skier. She competed in the women's giant slalom at the 1976 Winter Olympics.

References

1960 births
Living people
British female alpine skiers
Olympic alpine skiers of Great Britain
Alpine skiers at the 1976 Winter Olympics
Skiers from Sydney